"Situation: Grimm" is a single by Mista Grimm featuring Val Young from the Higher Learning soundtrack. It was released on December 6, 1994 as the soundtrack's second single and became a minor hit, peaking at 97 on the Hot R&B/Hip-Hop Singles & Tracks.

Single track listing
"Situation Grimm" (Album Mix)- 3:54  
"Situation Grimm" (Clean)- 3:55  
"Situation Grimm" (Instrumental)- 3:47  
"Situation Grimm" (Street Mix)- 3:59

1994 singles
1994 songs
Mista Grimm songs
Interscope Records singles